At the Edge of the Law  is a 1992 Argentine action thriller film directed and written by Juan Carlos Desanzo. The film starred Rodolfo Ranni and Gerardo Romano.

Synopsis
A pair of swindlers robs a hotel in Miami. Both are persecuted by the one in charge of security, and they take revenge.

Cast
 Rodolfo Ranni as Rodolfo Rivas
 Gerardo Romano as Raúl Fontana
 Katja Alemann as Mónica Ferraro
 Ulises Dumont as Gauna
 Jorge Sassi as Oficial Sánchez
 Vando Villamil as Beany
 Marcos Woinsky as Gerente
 Theodore McNabney
 Enrique Mazza
 Daniel Ripari

Release
The film premiered on 7 May 1992.

External links
 

1992 films
1990s Spanish-language films
1992 action thriller films
Films set in the United States
Argentine action thriller films
1990s Argentine films